Bernissartia ('of Bernissart') is an extinct genus of neosuchian crocodyliform that lived in the Early Cretaceous, around 130 million years ago.

At only  in length, Bernissartia is one of the smallest crocodyliforms that ever lived. It resembled modern species in many respects, and was probably semi-aquatic. It had long, pointed teeth at the front of the jaws that would have been of use in catching fish, but broad and flat teeth at the back of its jaws that were suited for crushing hard food, such as shellfish, and possibly bones.

It is known primarily from skulls and skeletons found in the Sainte-Barbe Clays Formation of Belgium and the Camarillas Formation of Spain.  Less complete material has been referred to Bernissartia from the United Kingdom and North America.

See also 
 Koumpiodontosuchus aprosdokiti
 Smallest organisms

References 

Neosuchians
Early Cretaceous crocodylomorphs of Europe
Cretaceous England
Fossils of Great Britain
Cretaceous Spain
Fossils of Spain
Camarillas Formation
La Huérguina Formation
Fossil taxa described in 1883
Taxa named by Louis Dollo
Prehistoric pseudosuchian genera